Acanthurus chronixis is a tropical fish known commonly as the chronixis surgeonfish or the half black mimic surgeonfish. It was first named by Randall in 1960. The species lives in coral reefs in the western Pacific.

References

Acanthurus
Taxa named by John Ernest Randall
Fish described in 1960